The football tournament at the 1961 Southeast Asian Peninsular Games was held from 11 December to 16 December 1959 in Rangoon, Burma.

In the second semi-final match between Malaya and Thailand, the match ended in a 2-2 draw. The tournament committee met on 15 December to choose a team to play in the finals. It was eventually decided to draw lots to decide which team to play and Malaya was chosen.

Results

Group stage

Group A

Group B

Knockout stage

Semi-finals

Bronze medal match

Gold medal match

Medal winners

Notes

References

External links
South East Asian Peninsula Games 1961 at RSSSF

Southeast
Football at the Southeast Asian Games
Football
1961